Boiling Point, known in Japan as , is a 1990 Japanese crime film written and directed by Takeshi Kitano, who also co-stars under his stage name Beat Takeshi. It was Kitano's second film as a director and first film as a screenwriter. Boiling Point is seen as an important first step in his development as an editor and as a director.

Plot outline
Masaki is a shiftless, inattentive young man who is a member of a losing local baseball team, whose coach is threatened and attacked by a local yakuza. He teams up with a friend to go to Okinawa to purchase guns so they can get revenge. A psychotic yakuza member named Uehara befriends them upon their arrival in Okinawa. Uehara has his own agenda of revenge, and as the story progresses the two boys drift further into his orbit, with unsettling results.

Cast 
 Takeshi Kitano as Uehara
 Yūrei Yanagi as Masaki
 Yuriko Ishida as Sayaka
 Gadarukanaru Taka as Takashi Iguchi
 Dankan as Kazuo
 Eri Fuse as Miki

Production
Kitano's trademark black humor suffuses the film in many ways: at one point, the boy finally does get a gun, but shoots out the windshield of his girlfriend's car by mistake. The film also features comedian Iizuka Minoru, also known as Dankan, who went on to become a Kitano regular (Getting Any?) and Katsuo Tokashiki, who is famous for his kickboxing skills in Japan. He also played a guard in Takeshi Kitano's Takeshi's Castle in the 1980s.

The original title, 3-4X Jugatsu, is the final score of a baseball game played in the film. "Jugatsu" (October) was added to the title, because the most exciting games of baseball, play-off games, are played in October.

References

External links
 
 

1990 films
1990s action films
1990s crime drama films
Japanese crime comedy films
Films directed by Takeshi Kitano
Films set in Okinawa Prefecture
Japanese crime drama films
1990s Japanese-language films
Shochiku films
Yakuza films
1990 drama films
1990s Japanese films